Pedro Alejandro Yang Ruiz (born October 9, 1976) is a retired male badminton player from Guatemala.

Biography 
Yang played badminton at the 2004 Summer Olympics in men's singles, losing in the round of 32 to Jim Ronny Andersen of Norway.

He moved to Denmark at the age of 24 and started training at the International Badminton Academy (IBA). Yang has won a gold medal at the 2002 Central American and Caribbean Games in El Salvador and bronze medals at the 1999 Pan American Games in Winnipeg, Manitoba, Canada and the 2003 Pan American Games in Santo Domingo, Dominican Republic.

Pedro Yang was appointed to the International Olympic Committee Athletes Commission from 2008–2016, Radio & TV Commission 2008–2013, and Athletes Entourage Commission from 2014.

Pedro Yang was appointed to the World Baseball Softball Confederation's Ethics Commission from 2016–present and served in the Badminton World Federation Athletes Commission from 2001 to 2016.

Pedro Yang is today a member of the ‘Champions for Peace’ club, a group of 54 famous elite athletes committed to serving peace in the world through sport, created by Peace and Sport, a Monaco-based international organization.

Degrees 
BA with Honours in Business Administration (Strategy & Management, De Montfort University, UK/ Niels Brock College DK.
Marketing Management Degree, Niels Brock College Copenhagen, DK.

References
cog.org
sports-reference

Living people
1976 births
Sportspeople from Guatemala City
Alumni of De Montfort University
Guatemalan male badminton players
Badminton players at the 2004 Summer Olympics
Olympic badminton players of Guatemala
Badminton players at the 1995 Pan American Games
Badminton players at the 1999 Pan American Games
Badminton players at the 2003 Pan American Games
Badminton players at the 2007 Pan American Games
Badminton players at the 2011 Pan American Games
Pan American Games silver medalists for Guatemala
Pan American Games bronze medalists for Guatemala
Pan American Games medalists in badminton
Competitors at the 2002 Central American and Caribbean Games
Competitors at the 2006 Central American and Caribbean Games
Competitors at the 2010 Central American and Caribbean Games
Central American and Caribbean Games gold medalists for Guatemala
Central American and Caribbean Games silver medalists for Guatemala
Central American and Caribbean Games bronze medalists for Guatemala
Central American and Caribbean Games medalists in badminton
Medalists at the 1999 Pan American Games
Medalists at the 2003 Pan American Games
Medalists at the 2007 Pan American Games